Victoria Theatre may refer to:
 Victoria Theatre and Concert Hall, located in Singapore
  (1859–1891), formerly located in Berlin, Germany
 Victoria Theatre (Dayton, Ohio), located in the United States of America
 Victoria Theatre, Halifax, located in West Yorkshire, England
 Victoria Theatre (Newcastle), located in New South Wales, Australia
 Victoria Theatre (Hammerstein's), a demolished theatre located in New York City, United States
 Victoria Theater (Harlem), a demolished theatre in New York City, United States
 Gaiety Theatre (New York City), a demolished theatre known as the Victoria Theatre from 1943 to 1980
 Victoria Theatre, Salford, located in England
 Victoria Theatre, San Francisco, located in the United States
 Victoria Theatre (Shamokin, Pennsylvania), formerly located in the United States
 O'Brians Event Centre, (formerly the Victoria Theatre), located in Saskatoon, Canada
  in Stockholm, Sweden
 Victoria Theater (Wheeling, West Virginia), located in the United States

Similar names
 Victoria Palace Theatre, located in the City of Westminster, England
 Apollo Victoria Theatre, (formerly the New Victoria Theatre, and before that the New Victoria Cinema), also located in the City of Westminster, England
 New Victoria Theatre, located in Woking, England
 Royal Victoria Theatre, Adelaide, South Australia, historical name for Queen's Theatre, Adelaide
 Royal Victoria Theatre, Sydney (1838–1880), in Australia
 New Vic Theatre, a replacement for the Victoria Theatre, in Stoke, Staffordshire, England
 The Old Vic (originally the Royal Coburg Theatre, later known as the Royal Victoria Theatre) located in London, England

See also
 Victoria Hall (disambiguation)